Khartoum is a district of Khartoum state, Sudan.

References

Districts of Sudan